The Langlade County Courthouse is Langlade County, Wisconsin's historic courthouse, located in Antigo, the county seat. The courthouse was built in 1905 by the architectural firm Kinney & Detweiler, replacing the first courthouse, which was built in 1882. The building was built in the Classical Revival style and includes murals by Swedish artist Axel E. Soderberg. In 2000, a glass addition was put on the building. The courthouse was added to the National Register of Historic Places on July 25, 1977.

References

Courthouses on the National Register of Historic Places in Wisconsin
Neoclassical architecture in Wisconsin
Government buildings completed in 1905
Buildings and structures in Langlade County, Wisconsin
County courthouses in Wisconsin
National Register of Historic Places in Langlade County, Wisconsin
1905 establishments in Wisconsin